The Trekking Carver is a French single-place paraglider that was designed and produced by Trekking Parapentes of Lambesc. Introduced in 2003, it is now out of production.

Design and development
The Carver was designed as an intermediate glider. The models are each named for their relative size.

Variants
Carver S
Small-sized model for lighter pilots. The glider model is AFNOR Standard certified.
Carver M
Mid-sized model for medium-weight pilots. The glider model is AFNOR Standard certified.
Carver L
Large-sized model for heavier pilots. The glider model is AFNOR Standard certified.

Specifications (Carver M)

References

Carver
Paragliders